Kallstroemia grandiflora, the Arizona poppy, is a summer annual herb of the deserts of the Southwestern United States, California, and northern Mexico.

Kallstroemia grandiflora has opposite, pinnately compound leaves. Large showy flowers often appear in abundance after summer monsoon rains,  with bristly trichomes, stipules, and orange corollas.

Gallery

External links
Jepson Manual Treatment - Kallstroemia grandiflora
Kallstroemia grandiflora - Photo gallery

grandiflora
Flora of Arizona
Flora of New Mexico
Flora of Texas
Flora of Northwestern Mexico
Flora of the California desert regions
Flora of the Sonoran Deserts
Flora of the Chihuahuan Desert
Flora without expected TNC conservation status